The Moorebank Rugby League Football Club is an Australian rugby league football club based in Moorebank, New South Wales. They currently play in the semi-professional Sydney Shield. The club also fields open age (mens and womens) and under age (boys and girls) teams in Sydney Metropolitan Combined Conference Competitions. Younger age club teams (Under 6' to Under 12) participate in the Canterbury-Bankstown Junior Rugby League.

Playing Record in NSWRL Competitions

Sydney Shield

Metropolitan Cup
Moorebank participated in the Metropolitan Cup during the 1990s.

Sources

References

External links

Rugby league teams in Sydney
Rugby clubs established in 1955
1955 establishments in Australia